Between independence in 1968 and becoming a republic in 1992, Mauritius was an independent sovereign state that shared its head of state with the United Kingdom and other states headed by Elizabeth II.

In 1968, the United Kingdom's Mauritius Independence Act 1968 granted independence to the British Crown Colony of Mauritius. The British monarch, Elizabeth II, remained head of state as Queen of Mauritius, as well as being Queen of the United Kingdom and the other Commonwealth realms. The monarch's constitutional roles in Mauritius were mostly delegated to the Governor-General of Mauritius.

Elizabeth II visited Mauritius 24–26 March 1972.

In 1975, a series of student protests turned violent.

The Republic of Mauritius was proclaimed on 12 March 1992. Following the abolition of the monarchy, the last Governor General of Mauritius, Sir Veerasamy Ringadoo became the first President of Mauritius.

Governors-General of Mauritius
John Shaw Rennie (12 March – 27 August 1968)
Michel Rivalland (27 August – 3 September 1968)
Leonard Williams (3 September 1968 – 27 December 1972)
Raman Osman (27 December 1972 – 31 October 1977)
Henry Garrioch (31 October 1977 – 26 April 1979)
Dayendranath Burrenchobay (26 April 1979 – 28 December 1983)
Seewoosagur Ramgoolam (28 December 1983 – 15 December 1985)
Cassam Moollan (15 December 1985 – 17 January 1986) (acting)
Veerasamy Ringadoo (17 January 1986 – 12 March 1992)

Seewoosagur Ramgoolam and then Sir Anerood Jugnauth held office as Prime Minister of Mauritius.

References

Specific

Former Commonwealth realms
Government of Mauritius
Lists of political office-holders in Mauritius
Mauritius and the Commonwealth of Nations
Monarchy
Politics of Mauritius
States and territories established in 1968
States and territories disestablished in 1992
1968 establishments in Mauritius
1992 disestablishments in Africa